Santa Fe College is a public college based in Gainesville, Florida, with satellite campuses in Alachua and Bradford counties. It is part of the Florida College System. It was established in 1965 as Santa Fe Junior College by the Florida Legislature and began offering classes in September 1966. As of Fall 2020, the school had an enrollment of 12,607 students, and offers associate and baccalaureate degree programs.

History 
Santa Fe Community College was established by the Florida Legislature in 1965 in response to a request from the Alachua and Bradford County Boards of Public Instruction, which had canvassed the area and learned that the community would be well served if all citizens have the opportunity for an education. Although the original name of the school was Santa Fe Junior College, the name was changed to Santa Fe Community College in 1972. The name sometimes caused confusion with the similarly-named college in Santa Fe, New Mexico.

In 2008, Santa Fe Community College officially changed its name to Santa Fe College to emphasize the bachelor's degree programs that it began offering.

Locations

Campuses 
 Northwest Campus, located in the Northwest side of Gainesville next to I-75, opened in 1972. The  campus serves as the main campus for the college.

Centers 
 Andrews Center, located in Starke, opened in the renovated Bradford County Courthouse in 1985. It expanded in 1991 with the restored Cultural Building and in 2001 with the Lillian Stump Center.
 Blount Center, located in downtown Gainesville, opened in 1990. Originally in the renovated 6th Street railroad depot, it expanded in 1993 and again in 2006 with a new classroom building.
 Charles R. and Nancy V. Perry Center for Emerging Technologies, located in Alachua, opened in 2009. The Perry Center serves as the home for the new Clinical Laboratory Technology bachelor's degree, as well as the biotechnology degrees.
 Davis Center, located in Archer, opened in 2003.
 Kirkpatrick Center, located near the Gainesville Regional Airport, opened in 1972. This center, also referred to at the Institute of Public Safety, educates law enforcement and corrections officer recruits and offers programs to train sworn officers. The Kirkpatrick Center also educates students in the Emergency Medical Services and Aviation Sciences programs.
 Watson Center, located in Keystone Heights, opened in 2005, with a second building being added in 2006.

Academics 

The college has more than 50 accredited technology and applied sciences programs, most which are two-year degrees.

Arts and Sciences Program 
Offering an Associate in Arts Degree, the Arts and Sciences Program consists primarily of liberal arts and sciences courses. This program culminates in a two-year liberal arts degree that can be transferred to a university which offers a bachelor's degree. The descriptions, course numbers and content of classes at Santa Fe College are the same as those in the first two years at Florida's public universities.
Santa Fe College's liberal arts courses are also transferable to most public and private four-year schools in the US.

Technology and Applied Sciences Program 
Offering the Associate in Science degree or certificate, the Associate in Science program consists of technology and applied sciences courses designed to prepare students for careers in skilled professions. Some of these programs enable them to transfer to a four-year college or university. Programs offered include Dental Assisting, Air Conditioning Repair, Automotive Technology, Child Development, Construction, Public Safety, Zoo Animal Technology, Information Technology, Cardiovascular Technology, Aviation Safety and Nursing.

Bachelor's degrees 
Santa Fe College offers nine bachelor's degrees: Accounting, Clinical Laboratory Science, Early Childhood Education, Health Services Administration, Industrial Biotechnology, Information Systems Technology, Multimedia and Video Production Technology, Nursing, and Organizational Management.

Library 
Santa Fe College is supported by the Lawrence W. Tyree Library, which is located in Building Y on the main Northwest Campus. Opened in January 2002, the $10 million building includes a coffee shop, multiple group study rooms of varying sizes, DVD and video viewing stations, computerized classrooms, a conference room and two reference desks. Additional technology and services available to Santa Fe College students and faculty through the Tyree Library include printers and copiers, BookScan stations, multiple charging stations, quiet study space throughout the third floor, and 87 computers distributed throughout the library's ample study areas, as well as a thorough online library catalog through which patrons can also request books and other media from library collections throughout the state.

The library is named in honor of former Santa Fe Community College president, Lawrence W. Tyree.

Athletics

Fight Song 

In 2009, Santa Fe College adopted a fight song. "Saints Forever" was performed for the first time on Tuesday, April 21, 2009 between softball games in Gainesville. The song was a collaboration between Chris Sharp, the college's director of bands, and Ryan B. Leverone, a Santa Fe College student.

Awards and recognition
In 2009, Santa Fe College was listed 6th in the nation in awarding A.A. degrees by Community College Week.

In 2012 and 2014, the college was named as one of the ten best community colleges in the United States by the Aspen Institute.

In 2015, the Aspen Institute gave the school the Aspen Prize for Community College Excellence as top-rated community college in the United States.

In 2015, Santa Fe College's Lawrence W. Tyree Library received the 2015 Excellence in Academic Libraries Award from the Association of College & Research Libraries.

Notable alumni 
 Debbie Boyd –– Former member of the Florida House of Representatives
 Robin Campbell –– U.S. Olympian from 1980 to 1984
 Craig Fugate –– Director of FEMA under President Barack Obama
 Adam Kluger –– Businessman, Advertising executive and founder of The Kluger Agency
 Connie Mack IV –– Former U.S. Representative and son of former U.S. Senator Connie Mack III
 Marco Rubio –– U.S. Senator, candidate in the 2016 U.S. presidential election, former Speaker of the Florida House of Representatives
 Karen Thurman –– Former U.S. Representative and Chair of the Florida Democratic Party
 Clovis Watson Jr. –– Former member of the Florida House of Representatives and current Alachua County Sheriff.

See also 
 Santa Fe College Teaching Zoo

References

External links 

 
 Official athletics website

1965 establishments in Florida
Buildings and structures in Gainesville, Florida
Education in Alachua County, Florida
Education in Bradford County, Florida
Education in Gainesville, Florida
Educational institutions established in 1965
Florida College System
NJCAA athletics
Universities and colleges accredited by the Southern Association of Colleges and Schools